The 1989–90 NBA season was the inaugural season for the Orlando Magic in the National Basketball Association. Several years after local developer and banker Jim Hewitt began promoting the idea of an NBA franchise in Florida, he was awarded the "Orlando Magic". The Magic, along with the Minnesota Timberwolves, joined the NBA as expansion teams in 1989. Hewitt's first move was to hire Philadelphia 76ers General Manager Pat Williams. Together, the two convinced the NBA to give Orlando a franchise after local fans made $100 deposits on season-ticket reservations. The Magic revealed a new primary logo, which showed a silver star as the letter "A" in the team name "Magic", along with a blue basketball with silver shooting stars. The team also added new pinstripe uniforms, adding blue, black and silver to their color scheme.

In the 1989 NBA Expansion Draft, the Magic selected veteran players like Reggie Theus, Terry Catledge, Otis Smith, Jerry Reynolds, Sam Vincent, Sidney Green, Scott Skiles and Mark Acres. The Magic received the eleventh pick in the 1989 NBA draft, and selected shooting guard Nick Anderson from the University of Illinois. The team also hired Matt Guokas as their first head coach.

On November 4, 1989, a sold out crowd watched the Magic lose, 111–106 to the New Jersey Nets in the first ever game played at the Orlando Arena. On November 6, the franchise experienced its first victory as the Magic stunned the New York Knicks, 118–110. The Magic got off to a surprising start, posting a 7–7 record in November. On February 14, 1990, before a game against the Chicago Bulls, Michael Jordan's number 23 jersey was stolen from the Bulls' locker room at the Orlando Arena; Jordan had to wear a number 12 jersey, and scored 49 points as the Magic won in overtime, 135–129. However, the team struggled through long losing streaks throughout their inaugural season, including a 15-game losing streak near the end of the season. The Magic finished last place in the Central Division with a record of 18 wins and 64 losses. 

Catledge led the Magic in scoring with 19.4 points and contributed 7.6 rebounds per game, while Theus averaged 18.9 points and 5.4 assists per game, and Smith provided the team with 13.5 points per game. In addition, Reynolds contributed 12.8 points per game, while Anderson contributed 11.5 points per game off the bench, Vincent provided with 11.2 points and 5.6 assists per game, and Green averaged 10.4 points and 8.1 rebounds per game. Second round draft pick Michael Ansley averaged 8.7 points and 5.0 rebounds per game, while Skiles contributed 7.7 points and 4.8 assists per game, and Acres averaged 4.5 points and 5.4 rebounds per game. Following the season, Theus was traded to the New Jersey Nets after only playing just one season with the Magic.

The team's primary logo remained in use until 2000, while the uniforms lasted until 1998. The black pinstripe road jerseys would be used as the team's primary road uniforms until 1994, where they added blue pinstripe uniforms, and the black pinstripe jerseys became their alternate.

Draft picks

Roster

NBA Expansion Draft

Prior to the 1989 NBA draft, the NBA held a coin toss between the Magic and the other new expansion team, the Minnesota Timberwolves, to determine their order for the NBA Draft and the expansion draft.  The Magic won the coin toss and chose to have the first pick in the expansion draft and pick 11th in the NBA Draft, while the Timberwolves picked second in the expansion draft and 10th in the NBA Draft.

The previous season's expansion teams, the Charlotte Hornets and Miami Heat, were not involved in this year's expansion draft and did not lose any player.

Regular season

Season standings

z – clinched division title
y – clinched division title
x – clinched playoff spot

Record vs. opponents

Game log

Regular season

|- align="center" bgcolor="#ffcccc"
| 1
| November 4
| New Jersey
| L 106-111
| Terry Catledge (25)
| Terry Catledge (16)
| Scott Skiles (7)
| Orlando Arena15,077
| 0-1
|- align="center" bgcolor="#ccffcc"
| 2
| November 6
| New York
| W 118-110
| Patrick Ewing (29)
| Jerry Reynolds, Charles Oakley (12)
| Scott Skiles, Mark Jackson (12)
| Orlando Arena15,077
| 1-1
|- align="center" bgcolor="#ccffcc"
| 3
| November 8
| @ Cleveland
| W 117-110
| Reggie Theus (26)
| Terry Catledge (12)
| Sam Vincent (11)
| Richfield Coliseum14,110
| 2-1
|- align="center" bgcolor="#ffcccc"
| 4
| November 10
| Detroit
| L 121-125
| Isiah Thomas (29)
| Sidney Green, Bill Laimbeer (10)
| Sam Vincent (10)
| Orlando Arena15,077
| 2-2
|- align="center" bgcolor="#ffcccc"
| 5
| November 11
| @ Atlanta
|- align="center" bgcolor="#ffcccc"
| 6
| November 13
| Atlanta
|- align="center" bgcolor="#ffcccc"
| 7
| November 14
| @ Charlotte
| L 116–130
|
|
|
| Charlotte Coliseum
| 2–5
|- align="center" bgcolor="#ffcccc"
| 8
| November 16
| @ Milwaukee
|- align="center" bgcolor="#ccffcc"
| 9
| November 18
| Philadelphia
|- align="center" bgcolor="#ccffcc"
| 10
| November 21
| @ Sacramento
|- align="center" bgcolor="#ccffcc"
| 11
| November 22
| @ Utah
|- align="center" bgcolor="#ffcccc"
| 12
| November 24
| @ Phoenix
|- align="center" bgcolor="#ccffcc"
| 13
| November 28
| Miami
| W 104–99
|
|
|
| Orlando Arena
| 6–7
|- align="center" bgcolor="#ccffcc"
| 14
| November 30
| Minnesota
| W 103–96
|
|
|
| Orlando Arena
| 7–7

|- align="center" bgcolor="#ffcccc"
| 15
| December 1
| @ Indiana
|- align="center" bgcolor="#ffcccc"
| 16
| December 4
| Portland
|- align="center" bgcolor="#ffcccc"
| 17
| December 6
| Atlanta
|- align="center" bgcolor="#ffcccc"
| 18
| December 8
| @ Miami
| L 114–122 (OT)
|
|
|
| Miami Arena
| 7–11
|- align="center" bgcolor="#ccffcc"
| 19
| December 10
| L.A. Lakers
|- align="center" bgcolor="#ffcccc"
| 20
| December 12
| @ Milwaukee
|- align="center" bgcolor="#ffcccc"
| 21
| December 14
| @ Chicago
|- align="center" bgcolor="#ffcccc"
| 22
| December 16
| @ San Antonio
|- align="center" bgcolor="#ffcccc"
| 23
| December 17
| @ Houston
|- align="center" bgcolor="#ccffcc"
| 24
| December 20
| Chicago
|- align="center" bgcolor="#ffcccc"
| 25
| December 22
| Denver
|- align="center" bgcolor="#ffcccc"
| 26
| December 23
| @ Detroit
|- align="center" bgcolor="#ffcccc"
| 27
| December 26
| @ Indiana
|- align="center" bgcolor="#ffcccc"
| 28
| December 27
| Indiana
|- align="center" bgcolor="#ffcccc"
| 29
| December 30
| @ New York

|- align="center" bgcolor="#ffcccc"
| 30
| January 2
| Detroit
|- align="center" bgcolor="#ffcccc"
| 31
| January 5
| @ Chicago
|- align="center" bgcolor="#ffcccc"
| 32
| January 6
| Cleveland
|- align="center" bgcolor="#ccffcc"
| 33
| January 8
| San Antonio
|- align="center" bgcolor="#ffcccc"
| 34
| January 10
| @ L.A. Lakers
|- align="center" bgcolor="#ffcccc"
| 35
| January 11
| @ Denver
|- align="center" bgcolor="#ffcccc"
| 36
| January 13
| @ Golden State
|- align="center" bgcolor="#ffcccc"
| 37
| January 17
| Boston
|- align="center" bgcolor="#ccffcc"
| 38
| January 19
| New Jersey
|- align="center" bgcolor="#ffcccc"
| 39
| January 22
| Phoenix
|- align="center" bgcolor="#ffcccc"
| 40
| January 24
| @ Philadelphia
|- align="center" bgcolor="#ccffcc"
| 41
| January 25
| @ New Jersey
|- align="center" bgcolor="#ffcccc"
| 42
| January 27
| Atlanta
|- align="center" bgcolor="#ccffcc"
| 43
| January 30
| Indiana

|- align="center" bgcolor="#ffcccc"
| 44
| February 1
| @ Milwaukee
|- align="center" bgcolor="#ffcccc"
| 45
| February 3
| L.A. Clippers
|- align="center" bgcolor="#ffcccc"
| 46
| February 6
| New York
|- align="center" bgcolor="#ccffcc"
| 47
| February 8
| Philadelphia
|- align="center" bgcolor="#ccffcc"
| 48
| February 14
| Chicago
|- align="center" bgcolor="#ffcccc"
| 49
| February 15
| @ Atlanta
|- align="center" bgcolor="#ffcccc"
| 50
| February 17
| @ Dallas
|- align="center" bgcolor="#ffcccc"
| 51
| February 20
| Seattle
|- align="center" bgcolor="#ffcccc"
| 52
| February 21
| @ Detroit
|- align="center" bgcolor="#ffcccc"
| 53
| February 23
| @ Cleveland
|- align="center" bgcolor="#ffcccc"
| 54
| February 24
| @ Washington
|- align="center" bgcolor="#ffcccc"
| 55
| February 26
| @ Philadelphia
|- align="center" bgcolor="#ccffcc"
| 56
| February 27
| Charlotte
| W 115–109
|
|
|
| Orlando Arena
| 16–40

|- align="center" bgcolor="#ffcccc"
| 57
| March 1
| Sacramento
|- align="center" bgcolor="#ffcccc"
| 58
| March 3
| Washington
|- align="center" bgcolor="#ffcccc"
| 59
| March 6
| Utah
|- align="center" bgcolor="#ffcccc"
| 60
| March 7
| @ Miami
| L 105–122
|
|
|
| Miami Arena
| 16–44
|- align="center" bgcolor="#ffcccc"
| 61
| March 10
| @ L.A. Clippers
|- align="center" bgcolor="#ffcccc"
| 62
| March 12
| @ Seattle
|- align="center" bgcolor="#ffcccc"
| 63
| March 13
| @ Portland
|- align="center" bgcolor="#ffcccc"
| 64
| March 16
| Boston
|- align="center" bgcolor="#ffcccc"
| 65
| March 18
| Cleveland
|- align="center" bgcolor="#ccffcc"
| 66
| March 20
| @ New York
|- align="center" bgcolor="#ffcccc"
| 67
| March 22
| Dallas
|- align="center" bgcolor="#ffcccc"
| 68
| March 24
| Milwaukee
|- align="center" bgcolor="#ffcccc"
| 69
| March 28
| Miami
| L 104–109
|
|
|
| Orlando Arena
| 17–52
|- align="center" bgcolor="#ffcccc"
| 70
| March 30
| @ Washington

|- align="center" bgcolor="#ffcccc"
| 71
| April 1
| @ Boston
|- align="center" bgcolor="#ffcccc"
| 72
| April 3
| Golden State
|- align="center" bgcolor="#ffcccc"
| 73
| April 5
| @ Chicago
|- align="center" bgcolor="#ffcccc"
| 74
| April 6
| @ Indiana
|- align="center" bgcolor="#ffcccc"
| 75
| April 8
| Houston
|- align="center" bgcolor="#ffcccc"
| 76
| April 10
| Milwaukee
|- align="center" bgcolor="#ffcccc"
| 77
| April 13
| @ Minnesota
| L 102–117
|
|
|
| Hubert H. Humphrey Metrodome
| 17–60
|- align="center" bgcolor="#ffcccc"
| 78
| April 14
| @ Detroit
|- align="center" bgcolor="#ffcccc"
| 79
| April 17
| Washington
|- align="center" bgcolor="#ffcccc"
| 80
| April 18
| @ Boston
|- align="center" bgcolor="#ffcccc"
| 81
| April 20
| Cleveland
|- align="center" bgcolor="#ccffcc"
| 82
| April 22
| @ New Jersey

Player statistics

Season

Transactions

References

 Orlando Magic on Database Basketball
 Orlando Magic on Basketball Reference

Orlando Magic seasons
Orlando Magic
Orlando Magic
1989–90 NBA season by team